Hans Georg Adler (1904–1979) was a German musicologist, collector, and classical music promoter in South Africa.

Early life
Adler was born in Germany into a family interested and involved in classical music. His mother, Johanna Nathan, was a professional soprano  and performed for noted composers such as Brahms, Tchaikovsky, Busoni and Julius Stockhausen, who was her tutor. He studied music under Eduard Jung (a piano teacher from Dr. Hoch's Conservatorium, Frankfurt, specialising in talented future prospects) and left Nazi Germany for South Africa in 1933. There he was employed by a hardware wholesaler, and frequently performed keyboard works on air with the South African Broadcasting Corporation.

Contact and interaction with the musical scene in Southern Africa
Adler's passion for classical music grew as he matured, and fed his desire to offer South African music lovers the highest quality of international concert presence.
He was chairman of the Johannesburg Music Society (South Africa's oldest musical society, a registered non-profit organisation) from 1954 until 1969, when he became honorary chairman. The Society was among the first to invite many international artists and groups to perform in South Africa, and quickly expanded.
Johannesburg soon became the centre of performers' broad African tours, which included the large cities of South Africa (Pretoria, Durban, East London, Cape Town, Port Elizabeth), recordings with the South African Broadcasting Corporation (SABC), as well as visits to Kenya, the former Northern and Southern Rhodesia, Mozambique, the islands of Mauritius and Reunion, the former South West Africa, Angola and sometimes the former Belgian Congo.
Consequently, the quality and variety of concert life and classical music appreciation in Southern Africa improved vastly.

For this achievement and the musical museum he had built up, an honorary doctorate from the University of the Witwatersrand was conferred on him in 1978.

The collection and museum 

Adler's passion for and love of music consumed most of his spare time, and after World War II he began expanding the small library inherited from his father, adding classical music dictionaries, encyclopaedias, manuscripts, complete composer compendiums, etc. in many languages, and volumes of music scores. In addition, he acquired early keyboard instruments – a 1589 clavicytherium, clavichords, a glasschord, an octave spinet, harpsichords, a fortepiano and two modern Steinway grand pianos. The collection eventually comprised 19 instruments, and demonstrated the development of the piano. Also included was a viola d'amore.

Adler's library grew very comprehensive, especially in keyboard compositions and productions, and, together with the instrument collection, evolved into a museum housed in his Johannesburg home. Tours for university students were sometimes conducted, and the SABC periodically aired early composers' works which he would perform there (often together with touring overseas performers) on the antique keyboard instruments. 
Most of the musicians and groups touring Southern Africa through his invitation, between 1954 and 1978 were invited to browse in the library and try out the instruments. A number discovered interesting or little-known works. (See note 7 in: examples of unusual works referenced.)

The fine arts departments of South African universities were very interested in the museum, which was considered by some musicologists to be one of the more outstanding museums of this nature in private hands. It was eventually willed to the University of the Witwatersrand in Johannesburg, who opened a "Hans Adler Memorial Museum" in their Arts Building in 1980.

Examples of unusual works referenced
At one time he donated to the British Museum, who did not possess this, one of his two rare copies of Frontispice by Ravel, music which was unknown, as Ravel had violated his publisher's sole publishing rights when it appeared in the popular Paris magazine Feuillets d'art in 1919

Are there just 5 Beethoven piano concertos? H.A. has collection evidence of a 6th piano concerto of Beethoven's, and two other piano concertos that may be regarded as Beethoven's works
A violin & piano sonata with two movements by Robert Schumann, one by Brahms and one by Albert Dietrich, in honour of Joachim
A Schumann quartet for 4 horns and piano
A Schumann andante and variations for two pianos, two cellos and French horn, long out of print, as Schumann rearranged it for two pianos alone
Variations on a Russian theme, written by Artciboucheff, Wihtol, Liadov, Rimsky-Korsakoff, Sokolow and Alexander Glazunov
An original string orchestra serenade by Josef Suk
Leopold Mozart's 1st edition (1756) of a violin tutor
A 1492 Incunabula by Boetius. Treatise: Arithmetica Geometria et Musica Boetii

Borodin's almost forgotten piano quintet
A signed, numbered copy of Karlheinz Stockhausen's "Skizzen und Manuskripte" and one of Detlef Kieffer's "3 Pieces Breves" donated to him when they toured S.A.
A composition for him by John Ogdon and another by Julian Dawson-Lyell.
 Information and some photographs of the above examples can be seen on the H.A. "showcase of rare and unusual works" site.
He also donated, to South African composer/conductor/SABC Head of Music Gideon Fagan, a rare copy of Vol 1 of "The Edwin Fleischer Music Collection" for which Mr. Fagan had been searching for a decade.
Discoveries of unusual cello works by local cello enthusiast/journalist, Joe Sack, which he passed on to other professionals. These included works such as:
Theme and Variations on a Purcell Motif by von Weber
The Rheinberger cello sonatas
a little-known concerto by Alcan
Over 125 touring musicians' dedicated photographs, recital programs and music-room comments during their Southern Africa tours.(Just a few examples: Elly Ameling (Dutch Soprano, 2 S.Africa tours), Paul Badura-Skoda and Eva Badura-Skoda (Austrian Pianist and Musicologist/Librarian Duo), Malcolm Binns (British Pianist, 2 S.Africa tours), Enrica Cavallo/Franco Gulli (Italian Violin-Piano Duo, 2 S.Africa tours), Alicia De Larrocha (Spanish Pianiste, 4 S.Africa tours) Joerg Demus (Austrian Pianist), James Galway (Irish flautist), Heinz Holliger (Swiss Oboist), John Ogdon (English Pianist, 4 S.Africa tours), Siegfried Palm (German Cellist, 2 S.Africa tours), Edith Peinemann (German Violinist, 5 S.Africa tours), Hans Richter-Haaser (German Pianist, 4 S.Africa tours), Volker Schmidt-Gertenbach (German Conductor), Ruth Slenczynska (American Pianist, 2 S.Africa tours), Gerard Souzay (French Baritone, 3 S.Africa tours), Karlheinz Stockhausen (Modern German Composer), Sergio Varella-Cid (Portuguese Pianist), Gaspar Cassado (Spanish Cellist, 3 S.Africa tours), Loewenguth Quartet, Hungarian Quartet, Koeckert Quartet (repeated tours among the many noted ensembles who visited), Maria Stader (Austro-Hungarian soprano), Shura Cherkassky (Russian Pianist, 3 S Africa tours), Aaron Rosand (American violinist, 3 S.Africa tours), Salvatore Accardo (Italian violinist/conductor, 3 S.Africa tours), Jean-Pierre Rampal (French flautist, 3 S.Africa tours), Julian Lloyd Webber (British cellist))

References 

1904 births
1979 deaths
South African musicologists
South African collectors
Music promoters
20th-century musicologists
German emigrants to South Africa